The Japanese wobbegong (Orectolobus japonicus) is a carpet shark in the family Orectolobidae of the wobbegong family, found in the tropical western Pacific Ocean from Japan and Korea to Viet Nam and the Philippines, between latitudes 43 and 6°N.  It reaches a length of 1 m.
Japanese wobbegong sharks typically remain motionless during the daytime, and are not active hunters. They use camouflage and their electroreceptor pores on their dorsal area to help them sense prey nearby.

See also

 List of sharks

References

 
 Theiss, S. M., Collin, S. P. & Hart, N. S. Morphology and distribution of the ampullary electroreceptors in wobbegong sharks: implications for feeding behaviour. Mar Biol 158, 723–735 (2011).

Japanese wobbegong
Fish of Japan
Marine fauna of East Asia
Taxa named by Charles Tate Regan
Japanese wobbegong